The 2017 Liga Futebol Amadora is the second season of the Liga Futebol Amadora. The season began on 18 February 2017. The Primeira Divisão began on February 18 and finished on September 16, while the Segunda Divisão began on March 7 and was finished in the final match on September 22. 

All Primeira Divisão games are played at the Baucau Municipal Stadium and Malibaca Yamato Stadium, while Segunda Divisão and Segunda Divisão Promotion Playoff games are played at the Dili Municipal Stadium. Primeira Divisão games used Dili Municipal Stadium for matchday 12 on 10-13 August 2017, matchday 13 on 1-4 September 2017 and three matches in matchday 14 on 7-9 September 2017.

Sport Laulara e Benfica is the current Primeira Divisão defending champions.

League table

Primera Divisao

Segunda Divisao

Segunda Divisao Promotion Playoff

First round
This round match held between 16 and 22 May 2017.

|-

|}

Second round
This round match held between 23 and 24 May 2017. União Tokodede and Lalenok United received a bye.

|-

|}

Semifinals
The semifinals held between 26 and 28 May 2017. 

|-

|}
FC Lero and Lalenok United promoted.

Play-off
The final held on 31 May 2017 in Municipal Stadium. 

|-

|}
Fitun Estudante promoted.

See also
 2017 LFA Primeira
 2017 LFA Segunda
 2017 Taça 12 de Novembro
 2017 LFA Super Taça
 2017 LFA Segunda Divisao Promotion Playoff

References

External links
Official website
Official Facebook page

Liga Futebol Amadora
Timor-Leste